Banffshire ;) is a historic county, registration county and lieutenancy area of Scotland. The county town is Banff, although the largest settlement is Buckie to the west. It borders the Moray Firth to the north, Morayshire and Inverness-shire to the west, and Aberdeenshire to the east and south.

Local government council

Between 1890 and 1975 the County of Banff, also known as Banffshire, had its own county council. Banffshire County Council was based at the Sheriff Court and County Hall. 

In 1975 Banffshire was abolished for the purpose of local government and its territory divided between the local government districts of Moray and Banff and Buchan, which lay within the Grampian region. In 1996, the Grampian region was abolished, and the area now lies within the council areas of Moray and Aberdeenshire (note that both these polities have different boundaries to the historic counties of the same names).

Geography

Banffshire consists of a 30-mile segment of coast along the Moray Firth from Spey Bay to Cullaykhan Bay, the immediate hinterland, plus a long, tapering 'tail' stretching inland some 55 or so miles, thus giving the county an elongated shape.

History

Considerable evidence of prehistoric human habitation exists particularly near the coastal area. For example, the Longman Hill cairn and Cairn Lee are situated in the northern portion of Banffshire in the vicinity of the Burn of Myrehouse.

Located in the area are the ruins of several medieval castles and the 12th century kirk of Gamrie.

Until 1891 the county contained various exclaves which were locally situated in Aberdeenshire, the biggest being the parish and village of St. Fergus.

Civil parishes

Civil parishes are still used for some statistical purposes, and separate census figures are published for them. As their areas have been largely unchanged since the 19th century this allows for comparison of population figures over an extended period of time.

From 1845 to 1930, parishes formed part of the local government system of Scotland, having parochial boards from 1845 to 1894.

 Aberlour
 Alvah
 Banff
 Bellie (probably now all in Moray)
 Boharm
 Botriphnie Drummuir
 Boyndie
 Cabrach
 Cullen
 Deskford
 Fordyce
 Forglen
 Gamrie
 Glass
 Grange
 Inveraven or Inveravon
 Inverkeithny
 Keith
 Kirkmichael (possibly all in Banffshire)
 Marlach or Marnoch
 Mortlach   (Mortlach distillery)
 Rathven
 Rothiemay Milltown of Rothiemay
 Rothnie
 Ontiquhill or Ordiquhill

Settlements

Aberchirder
Banff
Bogmuir
Buckie
Charlestown of Aberlour
Cornhill
Craigellachie
Cullen
Dufftown
Findochty
Fordyce
Gardenstown
Glenlivet
Ianstown
Keith
Kirktown of Alvah
Kirktown of Mortlach
Ladysbridge
Lintmill
Macduff
Marypark
Milltown of Rothiemay
Newmill
Portessie
Portgordon
Portknockie
Portsoy
Rathven
Sandend
Spey Bay
Tomintoul
Upper Dallachy
Whitehills

Transport
The Aberdeen–Inverness railway line runs through the town of Keith in the north of the county.

Architecture

Principal mansions
Principal mansions in Banffshire c. 1854 The Imperial Gazetteer of Scotland (1854) Vol. I. by the Rev. John Marius Wilson lists the following :

Auchintoul
Auchlunkart House  (A. Steuart)
Balveny Castle  or Balvenie Castle
Cairfield House  (John Gordon)
Cullen House  (Earl of Seafield)
Duff House
Edingight House  (Major A.F. Innes Taylor)
Forglen House and Birkenbog  (Sir Robert Abercrombie)
Gordon Castle  (Duke of Richmond)
Letterfourie  (Sir William Gordon)
Mayen House  (William Duff)
Mount-coffer House (Earl of Fife)
Park House  (Colonel Thomas Gordon)
Rothiemay

Castles in Banffshire

Auchindune  Auchindoun Castle
Balveny or Balvenie
Banff
Cullen (near Cullen) 
Deskford
Edinglassie
Findochty
Galval or Gouldwell Castle (Boharm Civil Parish)
Grange
Inchdrewer, Banff Parish
Park
Scuth

Notable residents
 James Abercromby, (1706–1781), born in Glassaugh, British general in the French and Indian War
 Francis George Cumming (1861–1941), salvation army officer, chaplain, social worker and probation officer
 Captain George Duff RN (c. 1 February 1764 – 21 October 1805) was a Royal Navy officer during the American War of Independence, the French Revolutionary Wars and the Napoleonic Wars, who was killed by a cannonball at the Battle of Trafalgar. Born in Banff
 James Ferguson, FRS (1710–1776), born Rothiemay, astronomer and instrument maker
 George Gauld (surveyor)
 James Grant (1706–1778) Roman Catholic priest who served as an underground missionary on the Isle of Barra and later as the vicar apostolic of the Lowland District of Scotland
 Saint John Ogilvie, (1579–1615), born in Keith was a Scottish Catholic martyr.
 George Stephen, 1st Baron Mount Stephen, 1829–1921, Canadian railway executive who named Banff, Alberta, after his birthplace; Banff National Park and Banff Springs Hotel are linked to Stephen back to Banffshire.

Surnames
Most common surnames in Banffshire at the time of the United Kingdom Census of 1881:

 Smith
 Grant
 Wilson
 Reid
 Watt
 Stuart
 Morrison
 Murray
 Cowie
 McDonald

See also
Lord Lieutenant of Banffshire
Banffshire (UK Parliament constituency)
List of counties of Scotland 1890–1975

References

External links

 
Lieutenancy areas of Scotland
Former counties of Scotland
Counties of the United Kingdom (1801–1922)